This is an alphabetical list of fungal taxa as recorded from South Africa. Currently accepted names have been appended.

Ra 
Genus: Radulum Fr. 1825, accepted as Xenotypa Petr., (1955)
Radulum javanicum (Henn.) Lloyd 1915 accepted as Erythricium salmonicolor (Berk. & Broome) Burds., (1985)
Radulum lirellosum Lloyd.
Radulum mirabile Berk. & Broome 1873 accepted as Lopharia cinerascens (Schwein.) G. Cunn., (1956)
Radulum orbiculare  Fr. 1825 accepted as Xylodon radula (Fr.) Ţura, Zmitr., Wasser & Spirin, (2011)

Genus: Ramalina Ach. 1809 (Lichens)
Ramalina angulosa Laurer ex Th. Fr. 1861 accepted as Ramalina australiensis Nyl., (1870)
Ramalina arabum (Dill. ex Ach.) Meyen & Flot. 1843
Ramalina australiensis Nyl., (1870) reported as Ramalina angulosa Laurer ex Th. Fr. 1861 
Ramalina bourgaeana Mont. ex Nyl. as bourgeana 1870 accepted as Niebla bourgaeana (Mont. ex Nyl.) Rundel & Bowler [as bourgeana], (1978)
Ramalina calicaris (L.) Röhl. 1813
Ramalina calicaris f. ecklonii (Spreng.) Nyl. 1860, accepted as Ramalina ecklonii (Spreng.) Meyen & Flot. [as 'eckloni'], (1843)
Ramalina capensis var. angulosa Th. Fr. 1861
Ramalina capensis var. melanothrix (Laurer) Th. Fr. 1861 accepted as Niebla melanothrix (Laurer) Kistenich, Timdal, Bendiksby & S. Ekman, (2018)
Ramalina celastri (Spreng.) Krog & Swinscow, (1976) reported as Ramalina linearis (Sw.) Ach. 1810 
Ramalina complanata (Sw.) Ach. 1810
Ramalina cuspidata (Ach.) Nyl. 1870
Ramalina cuspidata f. implexa H. Olivier 1892
Ramalina dendriscoides Nyl. 1876
Ramalina denticulata (Eschw.) Nyl. 1863
Ramalina duriaei Jatta (sic) possibly (De Not.) Bagl. 1879, accepted as Ramalina lacera (With.) J.R. Laundon,  (1984)
Ramalina ecklonii (Spreng.) Meyen & Flot. 1843
Ramalina euphorbiae Vain. 1901
Ramalina evernioides Nyl. 1857
Ramalina farinacea (L.) Ach. 1810
Ramalina farinacea var. squarrosa Müll. Arg. 1883 accepted as Ramalina peruviana Ach., (1810)
Ramalina fastigiata (Pers.) Ach. 1810
Ramalina fraxinea (L.) Ach. 1810
Ramalina fraxinea var. fastigiata (Lilj.) Fr. 1826
Ramalina geniculata Hook. f. & Taylor 1844, accepted as Ramalina inflata (Hook. f. & Taylor) Hook. f. & Taylor, (1845)
Ramalina geniculata f. tenuis Hue.*
Ramalina geniculata var. olivacea Müll. Arg. 1879 accepted as Ramalina inflata (Hook. f. & Taylor) Hook. f. & Taylor, (1845)
Ramalina gracilis (Pers.) Nyl. 1860;
Ramalina implexa Laur. (sic)possibly (Nyl.) Krog 1994
Ramalina inflata (Hook. f. & Taylor) Hook. f. & Taylor, (1845) reported as Ramalina geniculata Hook. f. & Taylor 1844,
Ramalina intermedia (Delise ex Nyl.) Nyl. 1873
Ramalina lacera (With.) J.R. Laundon,  (1984) possibly repoerted as Ramalina duriaei Jatta (sic) possibly (De Not.) Bagl. 1879
Ramalina lanceolata Nyl. 1870
Ramalina linearis (Sw.) Ach. 1810 accepted as Ramalina celastri (Spreng.) Krog & Swinscow, (1976)
Ramalina melanothrix Laurer 1860 accepted as Niebla melanothrix (Laurer) Kistenich, Timdal, Bendiksby & S. Ekman, (2018)
Ramalina membranacea Laur. possibly Mont. 1839
Ramalina peruviana Ach., (1810) reported as Ramalina farinacea var. squarrosa Müll. Arg. 1883 
Ramalina pollinaria (Westr.) Ach. 1810
Ramalina pollinaria f. cariosa Laurer 1870
Ramalina pusilla Le Prévost ex Duby 1830 
Ramalina scopulorum (Ach.) Ach. 1810 accepted as Ramalina siliquosa (Huds.) A.L. Sm., (1918)
Ramalina scopulorum var. cornuata (Ach.) Ach. 1810 accepted as Ramalina cuspidata (Ach.) Nyl.,  (1870)
Ramalina scopulorum var. humilis Schaer.
Ramalina scopulorum var. implexa Nyl.
Ramalina siliquosa (Huds.) A.L. Sm., (1918) reported as Ramalina scopulorum (Ach.) Ach. 1810 
Ramalina subfraxinea Nyl. 1870
Ramalina usnea (L.) R. Howe 1914 
Ramalina usnea var. capensis (Nyl.) Zahlbr. 1930;
Ramalina usnea var. contorta (Flot.) Zahlbr. 1930;
Ramalina usneoides (Ach.) Mont. 1837
Ramalina usneoides var. capensis Nyl.
Ramalina usneoides var. contorta Flotow. wccepted as Ramalina usnea (L.) R. Howe 1914 
Ramalina webbii var. capensis A. Massal. 1861
Ramalina yemensis (Ach.) Nyl. 1870.
Ramalina yemensis f. fenestralis Stizenb. 1890
Ramalina yemensis f. sublinearis Nyl. 1870
Ramalina yemensis f. tenuissima Müll.Arg.* 
Ramalina yemensis var. ecklonii (Spreng.) Vain. 1890
Ramalina yemensis var. lanceolata Nyl.*
Ramalina yemensis var. membranacea (Laurer) Nyl. 1870
Ramalina yemensis var. tenuissima (Meyen & Flot.) Zahlbr. 1930 accep-ted as Ramalina celastri (Spreng.) Krog & Swinscow, (1976)

Genus: Ramularia Unger 1833
Ramularia areola G.F. Atk. 1890 accepted as Ramularia gossypii (Speg.) Cif., (1962)
Ramularia gossypii (Speg.) Cif., (1962) reported as Ramularia areola G.F. Atk. 1890
Ramularia primulae Thüm. 1878
Ramularia richardiae Kalchbr. & Cooke 1880
Ramularia rumicis Kalchbr. & Cooke 1880

Genus: Ravenelia Berk. 1853
Ravenelia atrides Syd. & P. Syd. 1912 accepted as Uredopeltis atrides (Syd. & P. Syd.) A.R. Wood, (2007)
Ravenelia baumiana Henn. 1903
Ravenelia bottomleyae Doidge 1927 accepted as Spumula bottomleyae (Doidge) Thirum., (1946)
Ravenelia deformans (Maubl.) Dietel 1906 accepted as Ravenelia hieronymi Speg., (1881)
Ravenelia dichrostachydis Doidge 1927,
Ravenelia elephantorhizae Doidge 1927
Ravenelia escharoides Syd. & P. Syd. 1912
Ravenelia evansii Syd. & P. Syd. 1912,
Ravenelia glabra Kalchbr. & Cooke 1880
Ravenelia halsei Doidge 1939
Ravenelia hieronymi Speg., (1881) recorded as Ravenelia deformans (Maubl.) Dietel 1906
Ravenelia indigoferae Tranzschel ex Dietel 1894
Ravenelia inornata (Kalchbr.) Dietel 1894
Ravenelia laevis Dietel & Holw. 1897
Ravenelia le-testui Maubl., (1906)
Ravenelia macowaniana Pazschke 1894
Ravenelia minima Cooke 1882
Ravenelia modesta Doidge 1939
Ravenelia munduleae Henn. 1896
Ravenelia natalensis Syd., P. Syd. & Pole-Evans 1912
Ravenelia ornamentalis (Kalchbr.) Dietel 1906
Ravenelia peglerae Pole-Evans 1950 
Ravenelia pienaarii Doidge 1927
Ravenelia pretoriensis Syd. & P. Syd. 1912
Ravenelia stictica Berk. & Broome 1873
Ravenelia tephrosiae Kalchbr. 1886.
Ravenelia transvaalensis Doidge 1939
Ravenelia woodii Pazschke 1894,.

Rh 
Genus: Rhachomyces Thaxt. 1895
Rhachomyces dolicaontis Thaxt., [as dolichaontis] (1901)

Genus: Rhinocladium Sacc. & Marchal 1885
Rhinocladium beurmanni (Matr. & Ramond) Vuill. 1910 accepted as Sporothrix schenckii Hektoen & C.F. Perkins, (1900)

Genus: Rhinosporidium Minchin & Fantham 1905 (Mesomycetozoea) (Protozoa)
Rhinosporidium kinealyi Minchin & Fantham 1905
Rhinosporidium seeberi (Wernicke) Seeber 1912
Rhinosporidium sp.

Genus: Rhinotrichum Corda 1837
Rhinotrichum curtisii Berk. 1867 accepted as Acladium curtisii (Berk.) M.B. Ellis, (1976)
Rhinotrichum rubiginosum Lloyd (sic) possibly (Fr.) Sumst. 1911 accepted as Botryobasidium rubiginosum (Fr.) Rossman & W.C. Allen, (2016)

Genus: Rhizina  Fr. 1815,
Rhizina inflata Karst. (sic) possobly (Schaeff.) Quél. 1886
Rhizina resupinata Lloyd*

Genus: Rhizocarpon Ramond ex DC. 1805 (Lichens)
Rhizocarpon affine G. Merr.
Rhizocarpon badioatrum var. alboatrum Malme 1922, accepted as Rhizocarpon richardii (Lamy ex Nyl.) Zahlbr., (1926)
Rhizocarpon capense Zahlbr. 1936
Rhizocarpon disporum var. montagnei (Flot.) Zahlbr. 1926, accepted as Rhizocarpon disporum (Nägeli ex Hepp) Müll. Arg., (1879)
Rhizocarpon geographicum (L.) DC. 1805
Rhizocarpon geographicum f. atrovirens (L.) A. Massal. 1853 accepted as Rhizocarpon geographicum (L.) DC. 1805
Rhizocarpon geographicum f. intermedium (Stizenb.) Zahlbr. 1926
Rhizocarpon montagnei Körb. 1855 accepted as Rhizocarpon disporum (Nägeli ex Hepp) Müll. Arg., (1879)
Rhizocarpon patellarium (Stizenb.) Zahlbr. 1926
Rhizocarpon richardii (Lamy ex Nyl.) Zahlbr., (1926) recorded as Rhizocarpon badioatrum var. alboatrum Malme 1922,
Rhizocarpon viridiatrum (Wulfen) Körb. 1855

Genus: Rhizoctonia DC. 1815
Rhizoctonia bataticola (Taubenh.) E.J.Butler, (1925), accepted as Macrophomina phaseolina (Tassi) Goid. (1947)
Rhizoctonia crocorum (Pers.) DC. 1815 accepted as Helicobasidium purpureum (Tul.) Pat. 1885
Rhizoctonia lamellifera W.Small (1924), accepted as Macrophomina phaseolina (Tassi) Goid. (1947)
Rhizoctonia solani J.G. Kühn 1858
Rhizoctonia sp.

Genus: Rhizomyces
Rhizomyces confusus Thaxt.

Genus: Rhizopogon
Rhizopogon capfcnsis Lloyd ex Verw.
Rhizopogon luteolus Fr.
Rhizopogon niger Zeller & Dodge.
Rhizopogon pachyphloeus Zeller & Dodge.
Rhizopogon radicans Lloyd
Rhizopogon rubescens Tul.

Genus: Rhizopus
Rhizopus arhizus Fisch.
Rhizopus artocarpi Racib. (1900), accepted as Rhizopus stolonifer Vuillemin (1902)
Rhizopus nigricans  Ehrenberg (1820), accepted as Rhizopus stolonifer (Ehrenb.) Vuill.,  (1902)
Rhizopus stolonifer (Ehrenb.) Vuill., (1902),

Genus: Rhodopaxillus Maire 1913, accepted as Lepista (Fr.) W.G. Sm., (1870)
Rhodopaxillus caffrorum (Kalchbr. & MacOwan) Singer 1942 accepted as Lepista caffrorum (Kalchbr. & MacOwan) Singer, (1951)

Genus: Rhodotorula F.C. Harrison 1927
Rhodotorula mucilaginosa (A. Jörg.) F.C. Harrison 1928

Genus: Rhopalospora*
Rhopalospora caffra Massal.*

Genus: Rhynchosphaeria (Sacc.) Berl. 1890
Rhynchosphaeria fagarae Doidge 1941

Genus: Rhynchosporium Heinsen ex A.B. Frank 1897,
Rhynchosporium secalis (Oudem.) Davis 1919

Genus: Rhytisma Fr. 1819
Rhytisma eugeniacearum Corda 1840
Rhytisma grewiae Kalchbr. 1880 accepted as Phyllachora grewiae (Kalchbr.) Theiss. & Syd., (1915)
Rhytisma melianthi Thüm. 1876 accepted as Phyllachora melianthi (Thüm.) Sacc., (1883)
Rhytisma myricae Mont. 1856 
Rhytisma porrigo Cooke 1882 accepted as Cycloschizon porrigo (Cooke) Arx, (1962)

Ri 
Genus: Ricasolia A.Massal. (1855), accepted as Solenopsora A.Massal. (1855) (Lichens)
Ricasolia crenulata var. stenospora Nyl. 1859
Ricasolia erosa (Eschw.) Nyl. 1860 accepted as Emmanuelia erosa (Eschw.) Lücking, M. Cáceres & Ant. Simon, (2020)
Ricasolia patinifera (Taylor) Müll. Arg. 1888 accepted as Emmanuelia patinifera (Taylor) Lücking, M. Cáceres & Ant. Simon, (2020)
Ricasolia ravenelii (Tuck.) Nyl. 1863 accepted as Emmanuelia ravenelii (Tuck.) Ant. Simon & Goffinet,  (2020)
Ricasolia sublaevis Nyl. 1868

Genus: Rinodina (Ach.) Gray 1821 (Lichens)
Rinodina aethalea Ach.*
Rinodina albotincta (sic) Zahlbr. possibly Rinodina albocincta Zahlbr., (1936)
Rinodina bicolor Zahlbr. 1932
Rinodina capensis Hampe 1861
Rinodina confragulosa (sic) Müll.Arg. possibly Rinodina confragosula (Nyl.) Müll. Arg. 1887,
Rinodina conspersa Müll. Arg. 1889
Rinodina deminutula (Stizenb.) Zahlbr. 1931
Rinodina detecta (Stizenb.) Zahlbr. 1931
Rinodina exigua (Ach.) Gray 1821
Rinodina ficta (Stizenb.) Zahlbr. 1931
Rinodina hufferiana (sic) Müll.Arg. probably Rinodina huefferiana Müll. Arg. 1880
Rinodina huillensis Vain. 1901
Rinodina microlepida Müll. Arg. 1888
Rinodina microphthalma A. Massal. 1861 
Rinodina oreina (Ach.) A. Massal. 1852, accepted as Dimelaena oreina (Ach.) Norman, (1852)
Rinodina roboris (Dufour ex Nyl.) Arnold 1881
Rinodina sophodes (Ach.) A. Massal. 1852
Rinodina sophodes var. atroalbida (Nyl.) Zahlbr. 1931 [as atroalba]
Rinodina sophodes var. ledienii Stein 1888
Rinodina teichophiloides (Stizenb.) Zahlbr. 1931 accepted as Rinodina blastidiata Matzer & H. Mayrhofer, (1994)

Genus: Rizalia Syd. & P. Syd. 1914
Rizalia confusa Doidge 1924

Ro 
Genus: Roccella DC. 1805 (Lichens)
Roccella arnoldi Vain. 1901
Roccella fuciformis (L.) DC., (1805),
Roccella fucoides (Neck.) Vain. 1901 accepted as Roccella phycopsis Ach., (1810)
Roccella fucoides var. arnoldi (Vain.) Zahlbr. 1915
Roccella hereroensis Vain. 1900
Roccella hypomecha (Ach.) Bory 1828 accepted as Roccellina hypomecha (Ach.) Tehler, (2007)
Roccella hypomecha var. benguellensis Vain. 1901
Roccella hypomecha var. isabellina Vain. 1901
Roccella linearis var. guineensis Vain. 1901
Roccella linearis var. primaria Vain. 1901
Roccella mollusca (Ach.) Nyl. 1858 accepted as Combea mollusca (Ach.) Nyl., (1860)
Roccella montagnei Bél. (1834),
Roccella mossamedana Vain. 1901
Roccella phycopsis Ach. (1810),
Roccella podocarpa Vain. 1901
Roccella tinctoria DC. 1805 accepted as Roccella phycopsis Ach., (1810)
Roccella tinctoria f. complanata Vain. 1901
Roccella tinctoria var. hypomecha (Ach.) Ach. 1810 accepted as Roccellina hypomecha (Ach.) Tehler, (2007)
Roccella tinctoria var. subpodicellata Vain. 1901
 
Family: Roccellaceae Chevall. 1826

Genus: Rosellinia De Not. 1844
Rosellinia aquila (Fr.) Ces. & De Not. 1844
Rosellinia subiculata (Schwein.) Sacc. 1882
Rosellinia sp.

Genus: Rosenscheldia Speg. 1885 accepted as Botryosphaeria Ces. & De Not., (1863)
Rosenscheldia horridula Doidge 1921

Ru 
Genus: Russula Pers. 1796
Russula cyanoxantha (Schaeff.) Fr. 1863
Russula integra (L.) Fr. 1838
Russula pectinata Fr. 1838,
Russula rubra (Lam.) Fr. 1838

See also
 List of bacteria of South Africa
 List of Oomycetes of South Africa
 List of slime moulds of South Africa

 List of fungi of South Africa
 List of fungi of South Africa – A
 List of fungi of South Africa – B
 List of fungi of South Africa – C
 List of fungi of South Africa – D
 List of fungi of South Africa – E
 List of fungi of South Africa – F
 List of fungi of South Africa – G
 List of fungi of South Africa – H
 List of fungi of South Africa – I
 List of fungi of South Africa – J
 List of fungi of South Africa – K
 List of fungi of South Africa – L
 List of fungi of South Africa – M
 List of fungi of South Africa – N
 List of fungi of South Africa – O
 List of fungi of South Africa – P
 List of fungi of South Africa – Q
 List of fungi of South Africa – R
 List of fungi of South Africa – S
 List of fungi of South Africa – T
 List of fungi of South Africa – U
 List of fungi of South Africa – V
 List of fungi of South Africa – W
 List of fungi of South Africa – X
 List of fungi of South Africa – Y
 List of fungi of South Africa – Z

References

Sources

Further reading
 

Fungi
South African biodiversity lists
South Africa